In Uruguay—according to article 4 of Executive Decree 104/014—there are two types of higher education institutions:
 those engaged in teaching, research and extension to three or more unrelated subject areas, which use the name "university" (universidad in Spanish)
 those engaged in teaching, research and extension in one or more related subject areas, or in two unrelated, which are referred to as "university institute" (instituto universitario in Spanish)

Introduction 
During most of Uruguay's history, the University of the Republic predominated as the only university, whose founding process began in 1833 with the bill of the priest Damaso Antonio Larrañaga, the Oribe's decree of May 27, 1838 and the decree of 1849 that founded the UdelaR. In the same century, through executive decree of January 26, 1876, the Liceo de Estudios Universitarios was authorized with legal effects as university courses, thereby becoming in 1878 the Universidad Libre, later named Universidad Católica. This institution was closed in 1886 due to financial problems and legal issues. After this, only the University of the Republic remained for a long time.

At the end of the Civic-military dictatorship of Uruguay in 1984, the Executive branch passed Decree 343/984 in which the operation of the Universidad Católica del Uruguay was authorized (being this its refounding), and here began a shift "from a one-university system to a system of universities", in which coexist both public and private universities. Subsequently, Decree-Law 15,661  of October 29, 1984 validates university degrees issued by private universities with the same legal effects as those issued by the University of the Republic, which have been approved by the Executive and registered to Ministry of Education and Culture. These Decree-Law and Decree mentioned above (as were issued by unconstitutional organs) were validated by the Law of validity of acts of the military dictatorship government. In 1995, proceedings by which institutions can access the official recognition were established, through Executive Decree 308/995. This last regulatory decree was abrogated by Decree 104/014, which becomes the regulatory of the aforementioned Decree-Law.

Universities 
Públic:

Private:

Rankings

See also 

 Education in Uruguay

Notes

References

External links 

 Universidad de la República official website (in Spanish)
 Universidad Católica del Uruguay official website (in Spanish)
 Universidad ORT Uruguay official website (in Spanish and English)
 Universidad de Montevideo official website (in Spanish and English)
 Universidad de la Empresa official website (in Spanish)
 Instituto Universitario Claeh official website (in Spanish)
 Colegio del Espiritu Santo official website (in Spanish and English)

Education in Uruguay
Educational organizations based in Uruguay
 
Universities
Uruguay
Uruguay